The 1954 North Carolina College Eagles football team was an American football team that represented North Carolina College in the Central Intercollegiate Athletic Association (CIAA) during the 1954 college football season. In their tenth season under head coach Herman Riddick, the Eagles compiled a 7–1–1 record (6–0–1 against conference opponents), defeated Tennessee State in the National Classic, and outscored all opponents by a total of 180 to 57.  The Eagles were recognized as a 1954 black college national co-champion.

Schedule

References

North Carolina College
North Carolina Central Eagles football seasons
Black college football national champions
North Carolina College Eagles football